Tower of Babel is a 1928 woodcut by M. C. Escher. It depicts the Tower of Babel, a biblical story about people attempting to build a tower to reach God, which is found in Genesis 11:9. Although Escher dismissed his works before 1935 as of little or no value as they were "for the most part merely practice exercises," some of them, including the Tower of Babel, chart the development of his interest in perspective and unusual viewpoints that would become the hallmarks of his later, more famous, work.

In contrast to many other depictions of the biblical story, such as those by Pieter Brueghel the Elder (The Tower of Babel) and Gustave Doré (The Confusion of Tongues), Escher depicts the tower as a geometrical structure and places the viewpoint above the tower. This allows him to exercise his skill with perspective, but he also chose to centre the picture around the top of the tower as the focus for the climax of the action. He later commented:

See also
Belvedere
Waterfall

References

Notes

Works by M. C. Escher
1928 paintings
Woodcuts
Tower of Babel
Tower of Babel in art